The Science Academy Society (Bilim Akademisi Derneği) is an independent, private, self-governing organization founded on November 25, 2011 in Istanbul, Turkey.

The Association, referred to from here on as the Science Academy Society, is an independent institution that aims to bring together Turkish scientists. The Science Academy Society aims to raise public awareness about issues related to science practices, policies, education and ethics by organizing and overseeing conferences, meetings and publications by experts. Its main objective is to inform the general public and the institutions at large on the impact as well as the societal implications of scientific and scholarly research.

The Science Academy Society is also a member of All European Academies (ALLEA) since 2014.

Foundation 
The Science Academy Society was founded when the Turkish Academy of Sciences (Türkiye Bilimler Akademisi, TÜBA) lost its autonomous status following executive decrees on August 27, 2011, and November 3, 2011, which stipulated the appointment of TÜBA members by government agencies. 

The majority of the regular, honorary and associate members of TÜBA then resigned on the grounds that TÜBA had lost the quality of being an independent academy of science. 

Seventeen of these resigned TÜBA members founded the Science Academy Society on November 25, 2011, joined shortly after by most of the other resigned members.

Members 
The Science Academy Society has presently a total of 144 full members (86 from the fields of natural sciences, mathematics and engineering, 35 from social sciences and humanities, 23 from medical sciences) and 26 honorary members,

Activities 
The Science Academy Society engages in the following activities: 

 Organization of monthly public conferences in Istanbul and Ankara. The presentations and video recordings of these conferences are openly shared on the web page of the association.  

 Investigative reports, prepared by members of the Science Academy and addressing events concerning current economic and scientific developments, are regularly published on the website of the Academy.

 In cooperation with Boğaziçi University, the Science Academy also organizes the Feza Gürsey Summer Schools on topics ranging from cosmology to mathematics.

 The Science Academy Society Young Scientists Program (BAGEP) provides grants to financially support the research of promising young scientists and scholars. The program is entirely funded by donations from many individuals and private foundations, and as such, it is the first of its kind in Turkey.

References

External links
 All European Academies
 Feza Gürsey Summer Schools
 Turkish Academy of Sciences (TÜBA)

Organizations based in Istanbul
Scientific organizations based in Turkey
Scientific organizations established in 2011
2011 establishments in Turkey